= Dext Science Kit =

Dext Science Kit is a miniature science laboratory created by Ghanaian inventor Charles Ofori Antipem and his team to aid the practical teaching of science to basic school children. The set contains resistors, electrical conductors and cells for practical lessons in science. The Dext Science Kit has won a lot of international awards including the Most Innovative Education Solution in Africa, 2018 by the African Union Commission for Human Recourse Development Science and Technology Awards; the Africa Engineering Innovation Prize, 2018 by the Royal Academy of Engineering and many others.
